Cognitive therapy (CT) is a type of psychotherapy developed by American psychiatrist Aaron T. Beck. CT is one therapeutic approach within the larger group of cognitive behavioral therapies (CBT) and was first expounded by Beck in the 1960s. Cognitive therapy is based on the cognitive model, which states that thoughts, feelings and behavior are all connected, and that individuals can move toward overcoming difficulties and meeting their goals by identifying and changing unhelpful or inaccurate thinking, problematic behavior, and distressing emotional responses. This involves the individual working with the therapist to develop skills for testing and changing beliefs, identifying distorted thinking, relating to others in different ways, and changing behaviors. A cognitive case conceptualization is developed by the cognitive therapist as a guide to understand the individual's internal reality, select appropriate interventions and identify areas of distress.

History
Precursors of certain aspects of cognitive therapy have been identified in various ancient philosophical traditions, particularly Stoicism. For example, Beck's original treatment manual for depression states, "The philosophical origins of cognitive therapy can be traced back to the Stoic philosophers".

Albert Ellis worked on cognitive treatment methods from the 1950s (Ellis, 1956). He called his approach Rational Therapy (RT) at first, then Rational Emotive Therapy (RET) and later Rational Emotive Behavior Therapy (REBT).

Becoming disillusioned with long-term psychodynamic approaches based on gaining insight into unconscious emotions, in the late 1950s Aaron T. Beck came to the conclusion that the way in which his patients perceived and attributed meaning in their daily lives—a process known as cognition—was a key to therapy.

Beck outlined his approach in Depression: Causes and Treatment in 1967. He later expanded his focus to include anxiety disorders, in Cognitive Therapy and the Emotional Disorders in 1976, and other disorders later on. He also introduced a focus on the underlying "schema"—the underlying ways in which people process information about the self, the world or the future.

This new cognitive approach came into conflict with the behaviorism common at the time, which claimed that talk of mental causes was not scientific or meaningful, and that assessing stimuli and behavioral responses was the best way to practice psychology. However, the 1970s saw a general "cognitive revolution" in psychology. Behavioral modification techniques and cognitive therapy techniques became joined, giving rise to a common concept of cognitive behavioral therapy. Although cognitive therapy has often included some behavioral components, advocates of Beck's particular approach sought to maintain and establish its integrity as a distinct, standardized form of cognitive behavioral therapy in which the cognitive shift is the key mechanism of change.

Aaron and his daughter Judith S. Beck founded the Beck Institute for Cognitive Therapy and Research in 1994. This was later renamed the "Beck Institute for Cognitive Behavior Therapy."

In 1995, Judith released Cognitive Therapy: Basics and Beyond, a treatment manual endorsed by her father Aaron.

As cognitive therapy continued to grow in popularity, the non-profit "Academy of Cognitive Therapy" was created in 1998 to accredit cognitive therapists, create a forum for members to share research and interventions, and to educate the public about cognitive therapy and related mental health issues. The academy later changed its name to the "Academy of Cognitive & Behavioral Therapies".

The 2011 second edition of "Basics and Beyond" (also endorsed by Aaron T. Beck) was titled Cognitive Behavioral Therapy: Basics and Beyond, Second Edition, and adopted the name "CBT" for Aaron's therapy from its beginning. This further blurred the boundaries between the concepts of "CT" and "CBT".

Basis 
Therapy may consist of testing the assumptions which one makes and looking for new information that could help shift the assumptions in a way that leads to different emotional or behavioral reactions. Change may begin by targeting thoughts (to change emotion and behavior), behavior (to change feelings and thoughts), or the individual's goals (by identifying thoughts, feelings or behavior that conflict with the goals). Beck initially focused on depression and developed a list of "errors" (cognitive distortion) in thinking that he proposed could maintain depression, including arbitrary inference, selective abstraction, overgeneralization, and magnification (of negatives) and minimization (of positives).

As an example of how CT might work: Having made a mistake at work, a man may believe: "I'm useless and can't do anything right at work." He may then focus on the mistake (which he takes as evidence that his belief is true), and his thoughts about being "useless" are likely to lead to negative emotion (frustration, sadness, hopelessness). Given these thoughts and feelings, he may then begin to avoid challenges at work, which is behavior that could provide even more evidence for him that his belief is true. As a result, any adaptive response and further constructive consequences become unlikely, and he may focus even more on any mistakes he may make, which serve to reinforce the original belief of being "useless." In therapy, this example could be identified as a self-fulfilling prophecy or "problem cycle," and the efforts of the therapist and patient would be directed at working together to explore and change this cycle.

People who are working with a cognitive therapist often practice more flexible ways to think and respond, learning to ask themselves whether their thoughts are completely true, and whether those thoughts are helping them to meet their goals. Thoughts that do not meet this description may then be shifted to something more accurate or helpful, leading to more positive emotion, more desirable behavior, and movement toward the person's goals. Cognitive therapy takes a skill-building approach, where the therapist helps the person to learn and practice these skills independently, eventually "becoming their own therapist."

Cognitive model  

The cognitive model was originally constructed following research studies conducted by Aaron Beck to explain the psychological processes in depression.
It divides the mind beliefs in three levels:
 Automatic thought
 Intermediate belief
 Core belief or basic belief

In 2014, an update of the cognitive model was proposed, called the Generic Cognitive Model (GCM). The GCM is an update of Beck's model that proposes that mental disorders can be differentiated by the nature of their dysfunctional beliefs. The GCM includes a conceptual framework and a clinical approach for understanding common cognitive processes of mental disorders while specifying the unique features of the specific disorders.

Consistent with the cognitive theory of psychopathology, CT is designed to be structured,
directive, active, and time-limited, with the express purpose of identifying, reality-testing, and correcting distorted cognition and underlying dysfunctional beliefs.

Cognitive restructuring (methods)

Cognitive restructuring involves four steps:
 Identification of problematic cognitions known as "automatic thoughts" (ATs) which are dysfunctional or negative views of the self, world, or future based upon already existing beliefs about oneself, the world, or the future 
 Identification of the cognitive distortions in the ATs 
 Rational disputation of ATs with the Socratic method
 Development of a rational rebuttal to the ATs

There are six types of automatic thoughts:
 Self-evaluated thoughts
 Thoughts about the evaluations of others
 Evaluative thoughts about the other person with whom they are interacting
 Thoughts about coping strategies and behavioral plans
 Thoughts of avoidance
 Any other thoughts that were not categorized

Other major techniques include:
 Activity monitoring and activity scheduling
 Behavioral experiments
 Catching, checking, and changing thoughts
 Collaborative empiricism: therapist and patient become investigators by examining the evidence to support or reject the patient's cognitions. Empirical evidence is used to determine whether particular cognitions serve any useful purpose.
 Downward arrow technique
 Exposure and response prevention
 Cost benefit analysis
 acting "as if"'
 Guided discovery: therapist elucidates behavioral problems and faulty thinking by designing new experiences that lead to acquisition of new skills and perspectives. Through both cognitive and behavioral methods, the patient discovers more adaptive ways of thinking and coping with environmental stressors by correcting cognitive processing.
 Mastery and pleasure technique
 Problem solving
 Socratic questioning: involves the creation of a series of questions to a) clarify and define problems, b) assist in the identification of thoughts, images and assumptions, c) examine the meanings of events for the patient, and d) assess the consequences of maintaining maladaptive thoughts and behaviors.

Socratic questioning
Socratic questions are the archetypal cognitive restructuring techniques. These kinds of questions are designed to challenge assumptions by:
 Conceiving reasonable alternatives:
"What might be another explanation or viewpoint of the situation?
Why else did it happen?"
 Evaluating those consequences:
"What's the effect of thinking or believing this?
What could be the effect of thinking differently and no longer holding onto this belief?"
 Distancing:
"Imagine a specific friend/family member in the same situation or if they viewed the situation this way, what would I tell them?"

Examples of socratic questions are:
 "Describe the way you formed your viewpoint originally."
 "What initially convinced you that your current view is the best one available?"
 "Think of three pieces of evidence that contradict this view, or that support the opposite view. Think about the opposite of this viewpoint and reflect on it for a moment. What's the strongest argument in favor of this opposite view?"
 "Write down any specific benefits you get from holding this belief, such as social or psychological benefits. For example, getting to be part of a community of like-minded people, feeling good about yourself or the world, feeling that your viewpoint is superior to others", etc. Are there any reasons that you might hold this view other than because it's true?"
 "For instance, does holding this viewpoint provide some peace of mind that holding a different viewpoint would not?"
 "In order to refine your viewpoint so that it's as accurate as possible, it's important to challenge it directly on occasion and consider whether there are reasons that it might not be true. What do you think the best or strongest argument against this perspective is?"
 "What would you have to experience or find out in order for you to change your mind about this viewpoint?"
 "Given your thoughts so far, do you think that there may be a truer, more accurate, or more nuanced version of your original view that you could state right now?"

False assumptions
False assumptions are based on "cognitive distortions", such as:

 Always Being Right: "We are continually on trial to prove that our opinions and actions are correct. Being wrong is unthinkable and we will go to any length to demonstrate our rightness. For example, 'I don't care how badly arguing with me makes you feel, I'm going to win this argument no matter what because I'm right.' Being right often is more important than the feelings of others around a person who engages in this cognitive distortion, even loved ones."
 Heaven's Reward Fallacy: "We expect our sacrifice and self-denial to pay off, as if someone is keeping score. We feel bitter when the reward doesn't come."

Awfulizing and Must-ing
Rational emotive behavior therapy (REBT) includes awfulizing, when a person causes themselves disturbance by labeling an upcoming situation as "awful", rather than envisaging how the situation may actually unfold, and Must-ing, when a person places a false demand on themselves that something "must" happen (e.g. "I must get an A in this exam.")

Application

Depression

According to Beck's theory of the etiology of depression, depressed people acquire a negative schema of the world in childhood and adolescence; children and adolescents who experience depression acquire this negative schema earlier. Depressed people acquire such schemas through the loss of a parent, rejection by peers, bullying, criticism from teachers or parents, the depressive attitude of a parent or other negative events. When a person with such schemas encounters a situation that resembles the original conditions of the learned schema, the negative schemas are activated.

Beck's negative triad holds that depressed people have negative thoughts about themselves, their experiences in the world, and the future. For instance, a depressed person might think, "I didn't get the job because I'm terrible at interviews. Interviewers never like me, and no one will ever want to hire me." In the same situation, a person who is not depressed might think, "The interviewer wasn't paying much attention to me. Maybe she already had someone else in mind for the job. Next time I'll have better luck, and I'll get a job soon." Beck also identified a number of other cognitive distortions, which can contribute to depression, including the following: arbitrary inference, selective abstraction, overgeneralization, magnification and minimization.

In 2008, Beck proposed an integrative developmental model of depression that aims to incorporate research in genetics and the neuroscience of depression. This model was updated in 2016 to incorporate multiple levels of analyses, new research, and key concepts (e.g., resilience) within the framework of an evolutionary perspective.

Other applications
Cognitive therapy has been applied to a very wide range of behavioral health issues including:
 Academic achievement
 Addiction
 Anxiety disorders
 Bipolar disorder
 Low self-esteem
 Phobia
 Schizophrenia
 Substance abuse
 Suicidal ideation
 Weight loss

Criticisms

A criticism has been that clinical studies of CT efficacy (or any psychotherapy) are not double-blind (i.e., neither subjects nor therapists in psychotherapy studies are blind to the type of treatment). They may be single-blinded, the rater may not know the treatment the patient received, but neither the patients nor the therapists are blinded to the type of therapy given (two out of three of the persons involved in the trial, i.e., all of the persons involved in the treatment, are unblinded). The patient is an active participant in correcting negative distorted thoughts, thus quite aware of the treatment group they are in.

See also

 Cognitive analytic therapy
 Cognitive bias mitigation
 Cognitive-shifting
 David D. Burns
 Debiasing
 History of psychotherapy
 Journal of Cognitive Psychotherapy
 Recognition primed decision
 Schema therapy

References

External links
 An Introduction to Cognitive Therapy & Cognitive Behavioural Approaches
 What is Cognitive Therapy
 Academy of Cognitive Therapy 
 International Association of Cognitive Psychotherapy